This is a partial list of notable European Union Regulations.

Regulations of the European Parliament and of the Council

1995
Trade Barriers Regulation (TBR). Any EU company or group of companies can use the TBR to complain to the European Commission about obstacles to trade in third countries e.g. import bans, or about foreign trade practices which cause business problems within the European market, e.g. foreign subsidies. Investigations may result in several possible actions including reaching a settlement with the third country concerned or raising a case with the Dispute Settlement Body (DSB) of the World Trade Organization (WTO).

1996
Council Regulation (EC) No 2271/96 protecting against the effects of the extra-territorial application of legislation adopted by a third country, and actions based thereon or resulting therefrom.

1998
Council Regulation 1638/98 made changes to the organisation of the olive oil market in the EU. See Unión de Pequeños Agricultores

2001
Regulation 44/2001: assignment of jurisdiction and judicial cooperation in civil matters, replacing the 1968 Brussels Convention.

2002
Regulation 178/2002 of 28 January 2002 laying down the general principles and requirements of food law, establishing the European Food Safety Authority (EFSA) and laying down procedures in matters of food safety. This regulation established the Rapid Alert System for Food and Feed (RASFF). Regulation 178/2002 allows the sale of foodstuffs containing living animals if they are "prepared for placing on the market for human consumption".

2003
Regulation 1/2003 - Council Regulation (EC) No 1/2003 of 16 December 2002 on the implementation of the rules on competition laid down in Articles 81 and 82 of the Treaty (OJ L1, 4.1.03), the so-called "Modernisation Regulation". This regulation requires the designated national competition authorities of the Member States (NCAs) and the courts of the Member States to apply and enforce Articles 81 and 82 of the EC Treaty (Article 814 and Article 825 respectively) when national competition law is applied to agreements which may affect trade between Member States or to abuse prohibited by Article 82. It also established a 'legal exception' regime. These changes are often referred to as "modernisation".

2004
Council Regulation 139/2004 establishing that the antitrust national authorities of EU member States have the competence to judge on undertakings whose economic and financial impact are limited to their respective internal markets.
Regulation 261/2004, also known as the Flight Compensation Regulation - entitlements arising from a flight disruption.

2008
Regulation (EU) No 764/2008 laying down procedures relating to the application of certain national technical rules to products lawfully marketed in another Member State and repealing Decision No. 3052/95/EC. This regulation builds on the principle of mutual recognition and applies to products which are not covered by the harmonisation of legislation directed by the EU. See also the guidance documents for this regulation which are published by the European Commission. Decision No. 3052/95/EC was repealed with effect from 13 May 2009.
Regulation (EU) No 765/2008 on conformity-assessment activity.

2010
Regulation (EU) No 1095/2010 of the European Parliament and of the Council establishing the European Securities and Markets Authority.

2011
Regulation 182/2011 governing use of the European Commission's implementing powers, also known as the Comitology Regulation.
Regulation 1169/2011 on the provision of food information to consumers (FIC Regulation), subject to proposed revision.

2012
EU Succession Regulation (EU) No 650-2012, regarding wills and succession. It entered into force on 17 August 2012 and applied fully from 17 August 2015. Denmark, Ireland and the United Kingdom declined to opt into this regulation.
Regulation 1151/2012 on quality schemes for agricultural products and foodstuffs, includes provision for traditional speciality guaranteed (TSG) food labelling in Title III (articles 17-26).

2013
Regulation 1308/2013 - Establishing a common organisation of the markets in agricultural products. The following regulations were repealed: Council Regulations (EEC) No 922/72, (EEC) No 234/79, (EC) No 1037/2001 and (EC) No 1234/2007.

2016
Audit Regulation 537/2014/EU - This regulation and the amended Audit Directive (2014/56/EU) both entered into force on 17 June 2016. The regulation established arrangements for cooperation between audit oversight bodies in the EU.

2017
Regulation (EU) 2017/745 on the clinical investigation and sale of medical devices for human use.

2018
Blocking Regulation, originally enacted as Council Regulation (EC) No 2271/96, passed to "provide[s] protection against and counteract[s] the effects of the extra-territorial application" of certain specified laws, all of them being United States federal legislation.

2019
Regulation (EU) 2019/787 of the European Parliament and of the Council of 17 April 2019 on the definition, description, presentation and labelling of spirit drinks, the use of the names of spirit drinks in the presentation and labelling of other foodstuffs, the protection of geographical indications for spirit drinks, the use of ethyl alcohol and distillates of agricultural origin in alcoholic beverages, and repealing Regulation (EC) No 110/2008. This regulation noted that the repealed regulation (EC) No 110/2008 had "proved successful in regulating the spirit drinks sector", but "in the light of recent experience and technological innovation, market developments and evolving consumer expectations, it is necessary to update the rules on the definition, description, presentation and labelling of spirit drinks and to review the ways in which geographical indications for spirit drinks are registered and protected".
Regulation (EU) 2019/2088 of the European Parliament and of the Council of 27 November 2019 on sustainability‐related disclosures in the financial services sector, also referred to as the Sustainable Finance Disclosure Regulation (SFDR). This regulation was adopted in order to enhance transparency regarding the sustainability of financial products, and thereby to support the direction private investment funds towards sustainable investments.

2022
Regulation (EU) 2022/858 of the European Parliament and of the Council of 30 May 2022 on a pilot regime for market infrastructures based on distributed ledger technology, and amending Regulations (EU) No 600/2014 and (EU) No 909/2014 and Directive 2014/65/EU.

Implementing Regulations
Implementing Regulations aim to ensure the uniform implementation of European legislation. Their subject-matter is restricted to matters necessary for uniform implementation. An example is Commission Implementing Regulation (EU) No 668/2014, issued by the Commission on 13 June 2014, "laying down rules for the application of Regulation (EU) No 1151/2012 of the European Parliament and of the Council on quality schemes for agricultural products and foodstuffs".

References

External links
EUR-Lex: access to European Union law

Regulation in the European Union
Lists of legislation